The Rostov-Novocherkassk operation (January 6-10, 1920) was an offensive operation on the Don River of the Southern and the South-Eastern Front the Red Army against the White Guard troops during the Russian Civil War.

The operation  
In December 1919, the Red Army had conducted the successful Donbas operation (1919) in which the Donets River had been crossed and the Donbas conquered. 
In the night of January 6 to 7, 1920, Red troops captured Taganrog on the Sea of Azov, effectively cutting the White Army into two.

On January 7, troops of the 9th Red Army also captured Novocherkassk, the capital of the Don Cossacks.  
This forced Konstantin Mamontov's 4th Don Cavalry Corps, in defiance of Denikin's order, to retreat behind the Don.
On the night of January 8-9, troops of the 8th and 1st Cavalry armies began street fighting in Rostov-on-Don, and on January 10 completely captured it.

The Rostov–Novocherkassk Operation was followed by the North Caucasus and Odessa operations.

On January 16, the Supreme War Council of the Entente decided to lift the economic blockade against the RSFSR.

Battles of the Russian Civil War
Conflicts in 1920